The 1926–27 season was Real Madrid Club de Fútbol's 25th season in existence. The club played some friendly matches. They also played in the Campeonato Regional Centro (Central Regional Championship) and the Copa del Rey.

Friendlies

Competitions

Overview

Campeonato Regional Centro

League table

Matches

Copa del Rey

Group stage

Quarter-finals

Semi-finals

Notes

References

Real Madrid
Real Madrid CF seasons